Josephine Cox (15 July 1938 – 17 July 2020) also known as Jo Cox, was an English author. Her books were frequently best sellers and the UK Public Lending Rights figures often listed her in the top three borrowed authors.

Biography 
Born in a millworker's house in Blackburn, Lancashire, Cox was one of the ten children of an alcoholic father. At the age of sixteen, she met and married her husband Ken, and had two sons. When her children started school, she went to college, eventually being offered a place at the University of Cambridge.  She was unable to accept the Cambridge place because it would have meant living away from home and went on to become a teacher.

Cox won the "Superwoman of Great Britain Award", for which her family had secretly entered her when her first full-length novel was accepted for publication.

Cox also wrote under the name Jane Brindle, her mother's name. Altogether she wrote over 50 books.

Selected works 
The Beachcomber (2013) HarperCollins 
The Broken Man (2013) HarperCollins 
The Runaway Woman (2014) HarperCollins 
Two Sisters (2020) HarperCollins

References

External links 
Josephine Cox Books Official Website
Josephine Cox at Fantastic Fiction

1941 births
2020 deaths
People from Blackburn
English women novelists